Gibbethon or Gibbeton was a city in the land of Canaan which, according to the record in the Hebrew Bible, was occupied by the Tribe of Dan after the entry of the Israelites into the Promised Land. According to the Book of Joshua, it was given as a Levitical city to the Kohathites.

However, in  it was recorded as being a city of the Philistines. Nadab, the second king of the northern Kingdom of Israel, besieged Gibbethon. During the siege, Baasha the son of Ahijah, a member of the tribe of Issachar, killed King Nadab of Israel and made himself King, reigning over the northern kingdom for 24 years. Gibbethon has been identified with al-Majdal, near Ashkelon, and so possibly on the border of Danite Israel and Philistia. John James Blunt, in his Undesigned Coincidences in the Writings both of the Old and New Testaments (1882) suggested that "the place had been deserted by the Levites, in the general exodus to Judah, [so] that the Philistines availed themselves of the opportunity to seize and fortify it". Israeli archaeologist Benjamin Mazar locates it in a region to the north of the Sorek Valley, possibly at Tel Malot

References 

Hebrew Bible cities
Philistine cities
Tribe of Dan